Charles Cornwallis may refer to:

Sir Charles Cornwallis (diplomat) (died 1629), English courtier and diplomat
Charles Cornwallis, 2nd Baron Cornwallis (1632–1673), English landowner and politician
Charles Cornwallis, 3rd Baron Cornwallis (1655–1698), British politician
Charles Cornwallis, 4th Baron Cornwallis (1675–1721/22), British politician
Charles Cornwallis, 1st Earl Cornwallis (1700–1762), British peer
Charles Cornwallis, 1st Marquess Cornwallis (1738–1805), British Army officer and colonial administrator
Charles Cornwallis, 2nd Marquess Cornwallis (1774–1823), British Tory politician

See also